Manchester is an unincorporated community the town of Manchester, Green Lake County, Wisconsin, United States.

Images

References

Unincorporated communities in Green Lake County, Wisconsin
Unincorporated communities in Wisconsin